Old Bailey Stadium was a 3,000-seat multi-purpose stadium in Clinton, South Carolina. It was the former home of Presbyterian College football and, at the time of its demolition, the home for Presbyterian men's and women's lacrosse teams. The stadium opened before the opening game of the 1928 season, and its first game saw the Blue Hose fall to Mercer, 6–7. It served as the home for PC football until the first two games of the 2002 season. Its last football game was the 2002 home opener, against Charleston Southern, which PC won 26–6.

The stadium was demolished in the spring of 2018 to make room for new senior dorms, which were completed for the 2019–20 academic year.

References

Sports venues in South Carolina
Multi-purpose stadiums in the United States
Sports venues in Laurens County, South Carolina
Presbyterian College
College lacrosse venues in the United States
Lacrosse venues in the United States
1928 establishments in South Carolina
Sports venues completed in 1928
Sports venues demolished in 2018